Alan Gillett is an English football coach who has worked primarily in England for The Football Association and a number of club sides.

Career

Club career
Gillett has been involved in the management of Watford, Crystal Palace and Wimbledon, and was caretaker manager of Plymouth Argyle, alongside Gordon Nisbet, for two games in 1992. Gillett was later sacked by Plymouth Argyle, and launched a successful legal challenge to his dismissal. Gillett has also coached in Japan, Yemen and the United States.

International career
Gillett was appointed caretaker manager of the Malawi national side in 2003.
Gillett was manager of the Solomon Islands from 2004 to 2005.

He has also worked with the England under 18's squad.

References

1948 births
Living people
English football managers
Watford F.C. non-playing staff
Crystal Palace F.C. non-playing staff
Wimbledon F.C. non-playing staff
Plymouth Argyle F.C. non-playing staff
Yemen national football team managers
Malawi national football team managers
Solomon Islands national football team managers
English expatriate football managers
English expatriate sportspeople in Yemen
English expatriate sportspeople in Malawi
English expatriate sportspeople in the Solomon Islands
Expatriate football managers in Yemen
Expatriate football managers in Malawi
Expatriate football managers in the Solomon Islands